Le Mans Ltd., headquartered in Shibuya, Tokyo is an automobile parts manufacturer founded in 1967. The original company name was Le Mans Chamber of Commerce. The company is mainly engaged in the development and sales of motorsport parts and the import and sale of race cars overseas.

They also have a racing division called Team LeMans. The origin of the team name comes from 24 Hours of Le Mans. The team currently competes in Super GT, fielding the #6 Audi R8 LMS Evo II in the GT300 class for Yoshiaki Katayama and Roberto Merhi.

Team LeMans 
In 1969 Team LeMans was established as a racing department of Le Mans Chamber of Commerce. It has been active in a variety of categories since the 1970s as one of the top teams of Japan.

The team has competed in single-seaters since 1976, when they entered the All-Japan F2000 Championship. They served as the Japanese distributor of Reynard products until 2002. In 1991, Michael Schumacher, before his Formula One debut, raced with the team in the Sportsland SUGO round of the Japanese Formula 3000 Championship, while in 1996 his brother Ralf became the champion with the same team.

They also developed their own racing machine, that complied to Group C regulations.

In 2012 in collaboration with Hideki Noda they founded "NODA racing Academy Senior High School", several engineers such as Donuma Hiroyoshi, the team principal, have served as lecturers at the school.

History

All-Japan F2000/F2/F3000 Championship 
Their participation in the All Japan F2000 Championship started with Keiji Matsumoto in 1976. In 1979 he won the championship title. In 1988-89 Geoff Lees and Emanuele Pirro raced for the team, both winning one race.

Formula Nippon 
In 1996, the team had its most successful year in Japan's top level open wheel series, when Ralf Schumacher and Naoki Hattori took the first two spots in the drivers' championship, also winning the first team title. The team repeated wins in the drivers and team championship with Satoshi Motoyama in 1998.

Fuji GC 
The team achieved titles in The Fuji Grand Champion Series (Fuji GC) with in Keiji Matsumoto in 1983 and Geoff Lees in 1988 and 1989.

24 Hours of Le Mans 
Team LeMans first entered the 24 Hours of Le Mans in 1987 under the name Italya Sports. They competed in the race through 1990 without a single finish.

All-Japan GT Championship/Super GT 

Team LeMans first entered the All Japan Grand Touring Car Championship on its inaugural season in 1994, fielding a production based Nissan 300ZX-LM in the GT1 class with FedEx as their primary sponsor. The team took three top-10 finishes with Masami Kageyama and finished 17th in the drivers standings. Kageyama and the 300ZX returned to compete in the following year, but the team failed to score any points and was not classified in the standings.

For the 1996 season, Team LeMans bought an ex-IMSA Nissan 300ZX-GTS to compete in the rebranded GT500 class. Kageyama and series debutant Yuji Tachikawa took one top-10 finish in the final round of the championship at Mine Circuit and finished 25th in the drivers standings. Tachikawa stayed with the team for the 1997 season and was partnered by Tsuyoshi Takahashi, who replaced Kageyama after he was signed by SARD. The team took a 10th place finish in the season opening round at Suzuka, but a practice crash in the next round at Fuji totaled their 300ZX-GTS and the team was forced to withdraw their entry for the rest of the season.

Team LeMans didn't take part in the 1998 season, but they returned in 1999 after they took over the entry of the #6 Esso Tiger Toyota Supra from Inging Motorsport. LeMans signed former Formula One driver Hideki Noda and reigning GT300 champion Shingo Tachi to compete with the team, but Tachi was killed in a pre-season testing accident at TI Aida with less than two weeks before the start of the 1999 season. Former MotoGP champion Wayne Gardner was then signed by the team to replace Tachi. The team took a pole position in the third round at Sportsland Sugo and a victory in the fifth round at Fuji Speedway on their first season with Toyota, finishing 12th in the drivers standings.

In 2002, the team won drivers' championship in the GT500 class of the All Japan Grand Touring Car Championship with Akira Iida and Juichi Wakisaka, who competed in a Toyota Supra race car. Wakisaka, as team principal, would later led Team LeMans to a second GT500 class title in 2019 with the driving pairing of Kazuya Oshima and Kenta Yamashita, but the team left the series at the conclusion of the season. 

Team LeMans provided support to Hitotsuyama Racing in 2020 before they reentered the series in 2021 under a collaboration with Motoyama Racing. LeMans entered the #6 Audi R8 LMS Evo for ex-GT500 champion Satoshi Motoyama and Yoshiaki Katayama, son of the team's owner Yoshinori Katayama, in the GT300 class. The team finished all races that year, but was not classified as they failed to score a points finish. Motoyama and Katayama returned the following year with an Evo II model of the Audi R8 LMS, but Motoyama was released after one round. Financial issues on Motoyama's sponsors was reported to be the primary reason of Motoyama's dismissal. Roberto Merhi was then signed by the team to replace Motoyama for the rest of the season.

Team LeMans Results

Super GT (JGTC) 

 Season still in progress

All Japan Sports Prototype Championship

24 Hours of Le Mans

Super Formula (Formula Nippon, Japanese Formula 3000, Japanese Formula 2000)

Footnotes

External links 
 Ltd. Le Mans
 Team LeMans

Japanese racecar constructors
Japanese auto racing teams
Automotive companies based in Tokyo
Manufacturing companies based in Tokyo
Japanese Formula 3 Championship teams
Formula Nippon teams
Super GT teams
Super Formula teams
Toyota in motorsport
World Sportscar Championship teams
Auto racing teams established in 1969
Formula Regional teams